Temple president is a priesthood leadership position in the Church of Jesus Christ of Latter-day Saints (LDS Church). A temple president's primary responsibility is to supervise the affairs of an LDS temple in both an administrative and spiritual capacity.

The president is assisted by two male counselors and together they compose the temple presidency. Normally the wife of the temple president serves as the temple matron, and the wives of the president's counselors as assistants to the matron. The matron and her assistants share in the responsibilities of the temple presidency. All members of a temple presidency are ordained high priests of the church.

Selection 

Temple presidents and matrons, the president's counselors, and the matron's assistants are appointed by the First Presidency. Their background in church leadership varies, yet they are couples who are considered by LDS Church leaders as spiritually mature and capable of handling both the administrative and spiritual matters necessary for the successful operation of a temple.

During a training seminar for new temple presidents, held in the Salt Lake Temple, Thomas S. Monson told a group of newly selected temple presidents and their wives:

"We looked over the entire Church. ... We looked for men of God, wherever they might be. We found willingness to serve – not putting yourselves forward to volunteer, but being willing to serve. What a sweet experience this has been."

They may be selected from a geographical area near the temple or from another area. In larger temples, the president and matron usually serve for a period of three consecutive years. In smaller temples, they "have an indefinite period of appointment." Most temple presidencies serving in smaller temples are selected from church membership living within the temple district.

Administrative responsibilities 

The administrative responsibilities of a temple president include ensuring all ordinances are performed by proper authority and documented correctly; securing a sufficient number of ordinance and service workers to meet the needs of temple patrons;  overseeing the instruction of patrons, ordinance, and service workers; maintaining relationships with local church leaders; overseeing budgetary matters, property, and temple maintenance; and in larger temples the operation of cafeterias and visitor centers.

Spiritual responsibilities 

For Latter-day Saints, temples are considered literal houses of God the Father and Jesus Christ, a sacred space where mortals may commune directly with heaven. As such the greatest responsibilities of the temple president are those associated with LDS concepts of expanding divine contact within the temple. They include setting apart ordinance and service workers by the laying-on of hands; submitting recommendations to the First Presidency for counselors in the temple presidency and for additional sealers; performing ordinances; instructing first time patrons and youth groups on the sacred nature of temple work; privately answering various doctrinal and personal questions presented by temple patrons and workers; ensuring that the reverence and harmony required for temple worship is constantly maintained; and seeking inspiration and divine guidance on every aspect of his duties.

Additional responsibilities 

Temple presidents and matrons, or their representatives, attend stake conference meetings within the temple district. They sit on the stand and are often invited by the presiding authority to speak to the congregation. In these and other speaking assignments the topic is typically devoted to matters central to temple worship and devotion to deity.

Historical development 

The first temple president was Wilford Woodruff. He was appointed by the First Presidency to preside over the St. George Temple in 1877. Neither the Nauvoo Temple nor the Kirtland Temple, constructed earlier than the St. George Temple, had a president.

References 

1877 establishments in Utah Territory
Leadership positions in the Church of Jesus Christ of Latter-day Saints
 
1877 in Christianity
Presidents in the Church of Jesus Christ of Latter-day Saints